Aytaç Özkul (born 9 September 1989 in Turkey) is a Turkish professional basketball player of Fenerbahçe who is loaned to Fenerbahçe's second team Alpella. The center is 2.10 m tall.

Career
 Fenerbahçe
 Alpella

International career
AytaÖzkul is a regular Turkey National U21 Team player.

Vital statistics
Position: Center
Height: 2.10 m
Team: Alpella (loan from Fenerbahçe)

External links
Player Profile

1989 births
Living people
Turkish men's basketball players
Fenerbahçe men's basketball players
Alpella basketball players
Centers (basketball)